Mr. Rhodes is an American television sitcom which was aired by NBC as part of its 1996–97 lineup.

Summary
Mr. Rhodes starred comedian Tom Rhodes as an eponymous character who taught at a small-town preparatory school after having failed as a novelist.  He found that his high school fantasy girl, Nikki (Farrah Forke) was on the staff as a guidance counselor, and began a relationship with her.

Like the title character's writing career, Mr. Rhodes''' appearance on network television was a brief one; the program was not picked up for another season and the last broadcast was in March 1997.

Cast
 Tom Rhodes as Tom Rhodes
 Farrah Forke as Nikki Harkin
 Stephen Tobolowsky as Ray Heary
 Ron Glass as Ronald Felcher
 Jessica Stone as Amanda Reeves
 Shaun Weiss as Jake Mandelleer
 Lindsay Sloane as Zoey Miller
 Travis Wester as Ethan Armstrong
 Alexandra Holden as Dani Swanson
 Jason Dohring as Jaret
 Jensen Ackles as Malcolm

Episodes

References

Brooks, Tim and Marsh, Earle, The Complete Directory to Prime Time Network and Cable TV Shows''

External links
 

NBC original programming
1990s American sitcoms
1996 American television series debuts
1997 American television series endings
Television series by Universal Television
English-language television shows
1990s American high school television series
Television series created by Mark Brazill